Samen District is a district (bakhsh) in Malayer County, Hamadan Province, Iran. At the 2006 census, its population was 31,904, in 8,410 families.  The District has one city: Samen. The District has four rural districts (dehestan): Avarzaman Rural District, Haram Rud-e Sofla Rural District, Samen Rural District, and Sefidkuh Rural District.

References 

Malayer County
Districts of Hamadan Province